Laura J. Burns is an American author originally from Long Island, New York. Starting in publishing, she now specializes in novels based on television shows or movies. She often collaborates with fellow author Melinda Metz, with whom she writes the book series based on the Everwood TV show, and the Wright and Wong young detective series and the vampire beach series under the pseudonym of Alex duval, She was closely involved with the creation of the Roswell High series, and later became a staff writer on the Roswell TV series.

Selected works

Roswell: Quarantine (2003)
Charmed: Seasons of the Witch vol. 1 - Samhain & Imbolc (2003)
Charmed: Inherit the Witch (2004)
Charmed: Sweet Talkin' Demon (2006)
Darcy's Wild Life: A Fine State of Affairs (2006)
Darcy's Wild Life: Go West Darcy! (2006)

With Melinda Metz

"Abomination, Beauport, Brittany, France, 1320" in Tales of the Slayer vol. 2 (2003)
Buffy the Vampire Slayer: Apocalypse Memories (2004)
Buffy the Vampire Slayer: Colony (2005)
Everwood: First Impressions (2004)
Everwood: Making Choices (2004)
Everwood: Worlds Apart (2005)
Everwood: Change of Plans (2005)
Wright and Wong: The Case Of The Prank That Stank (2005)
Wright and Wong: The Case of the Nana-Napper (2005)
Wright and Wong: The Case of the Trail Mix-Up (2005)
Wright and Wong: The Case of the Slippery Soap Star (2005)
Kong, the 8th Wonder of the World (2005)
Kong: Escape from Skull Island (2005)
Crave (2010)
Sacrifice (2011)
Sanctuary Bay (2016)
I Do Not Trust You (2018)

References

External links

Interview with Laura J. Burns and Melinda Metz

Year of birth missing (living people)
Living people
21st-century American novelists
21st-century American women writers
American television writers
American women novelists
American women television writers
21st-century American screenwriters